Heath Cruckshank (born 28 June 1976) is an Australian former professional rugby league footballer who played during the 1990 and 2000s. He played for the South Queensland Crushers, Gold Coast Chargers, Leigh Centurions, Sheffield Eagles, St. Helens R.F.C., and Halifax Panthers.

Playing career
After the liquidation of South Queensland, Cruckshank joined the Gold Coast Chargers. Cruckshank was a member of the Chargers' last ever game in first grade which was a 20−18 loss to the Cronulla Sharks at Carrara Stadium. The Gold Coast club folded at the end of the 1998 season due to the rationalization of the competition during this time. In total, he played 18 games and scored 1 try.

References

1976 births
Living people
Australian rugby league players
South Queensland Crushers players
Gold Coast Chargers players
Leigh Leopards players
Sheffield Eagles players
St Helens R.F.C. players
Halifax R.L.F.C. players
Rugby league second-rows
Rugby league players from Brisbane